

Solids with full icosahedral symmetry

Platonic solids - regular polyhedra (all faces of the same type)

Archimedean solids - polyhedra with more than one polygon face type.

Catalan solids - duals of the Archimedean solids.

Platonic solids

Achiral Archimedean solids

Achiral Catalan solids

Kepler-Poinsot solids

Achiral nonconvex uniform polyhedra

Chiral Archimedean and Catalan solids

Archimedean solids:

Catalan solids:

Chiral nonconvex uniform polyhedra

See also 
 The Fifty Nine Icosahedra

Rotational symmetry